The Outcast Dead may refer to:
 Cross Bones, a former burial ground in London is said to house the "outcast dead".

Fiction
 The Outcast Dead, a 2010 novel in the science fiction series The Horus Heresy by Graham McNeill and based in the world of Warhammer 40,000
 The Outcast Dead, a 2014 novel by Elly Griffiths
 The Outcast Dead, title of the prologue in the 2011 Cassandra Clare novel, Clockwork Prince